Albert Salmi (March 11, 1928 – April 22, 1990) was an American actor of stage, film, and television. Best known for his work as a character actor, he appeared in over 150 film and television productions.

Early life 
Salmi was born and raised in Brooklyn, New York City, the son of Finnish immigrant parents. He attended Haaren High School in Manhattan. Following a stint in the United States Army during World War II, Salmi took up acting as a career, studying method acting at the Actors Studio in Manhattan with Lee Strasberg.

Career 
In 1955, Salmi starred as Bo Decker in the play Bus Stop on Broadway, and also performed in the touring production of the play. His performance was praised by critics, and Salmi was offered the chance to reprise the role in the film Bus Stop (1956) starring Marilyn Monroe. Salmi turned down the offer because he did not enjoy film work. (Don Murray was later cast as Bo and earned an Academy Award nomination for his performance.) Salmi turned down several other offers to make films before he finally accepted a role as Smerdjakov in the film The Brothers Karamazov (1958), with Yul Brynner, Lee J. Cobb, William Shatner, and Richard Basehart.  Salmi's next film was The Bravados (1958), in which he played one of the villains who is hunted down by hero Gregory Peck. The National Board of Review presented Salmi with the NBR Award for Best Supporting Actor for his work in both of these films.

Despite his numerous appearances in the medium, Salmi shared the opinion of many Actors Studio alumni that roles in film and television were "inferior" to stage work. One of his first television appearances was in the live, televised adaptation of the novel Bang the Drum Slowly (1956), featured on the anthology series The United States Steel Hour opposite Paul Newman and George Peppard. He also had several memorable roles on CBS's The Twilight Zone, including "Of Late I Think of Cliffordville", "A Quality of Mercy", and "Execution". In 1963, he portrayed John Day and Rivers in the episode "Incident of the Pale Rider" on the CBS series Rawhide. In 1964–65, he appeared with Fess Parker as Yadkin in the first season of the Daniel Boone TV series. He later appeared twice as the incorrigible pirate Alonzo P. Tucker on Lost in Space. He appeared in a 1967 episode of Gunsmoke as a killer who comes to an ironic end. For that performance, Salmi was awarded a Western Heritage Award.

A high point of Salmi's career came in 1968, when he was cast in the Arthur Miller play The Price. He played the lead on Broadway and in London.. From 1974 to 1976, Salmi co-starred in the NBC legal drama Petrocelli as local investigator Pete Ritter. 

Salmi's film career included roles in The Unforgiven (1960), The Outrage (1964), Lawman (1971), Escape from the Planet of the Apes (1971), Viva Knievel! (1977), Empire of the Ants (1977), Love and Bullets (1979), Caddyshack (1980), and the Robert Redford prison film Brubaker (1980). He played Greil in Dragonslayer (1981), Geraldine Page's husband in I'm Dancing as Fast as I Can (1982), and the hard-drinking but loving father of character Diana Lawson in Hard to Hold (1984). His final role in a theatrical film was in Breaking In (1989), starring Burt Reynolds.

Personal life 

Salmi met actress Peggy Ann Garner while the two were performing in the National Company touring production of Bus Stop in 1955.  They were married on May 18, 1956, in New York City.   Their only child, Catherine Ann "Cas" Salmi, was born on March 30, 1957; Catherine died in 1995 of heart disease at the age of 38.

Salmi married Roberta Pollock Taper in 1964. The couple had two daughters, Elizabeth and Jennifer. In 1983, the family moved from Los Angeles to Spokane, Washington, where Salmi went into semi-retirement, taking occasional acting roles. Salmi later taught acting and appeared in community and regional theater.

In February 1990, Albert and Roberta Salmi separated. He moved into their Idaho condominium, while Roberta remained in the family home in Spokane. She filed for divorce on February 6. According to court documents, Roberta Salmi claimed that her husband was an alcoholic who physically abused her when he drank. She also claimed that Salmi threatened her on several occasions, and she was in fear for her life. Roberta later took out a restraining order against her husband. In response to her claims in the court documents, Salmi denied physically abusing Roberta and blamed their estrangement on her emotional issues. 

On April 23, 1990, Albert Salmi and his estranged wife Roberta were found dead in their Spokane home by a friend who stopped by to check on her. According to newspaper accounts, Salmi fatally shot Roberta in the kitchen of her home, before shooting himself in an upstairs room.

On April 26, Salmi's funeral was held at the Hennessey-Smith Funeral Home, after which he was cremated and placed in a niche at Greenwood Memorial Terrace cemetery in Spokane.

Filmography 

The United States Steel Hour (1956–1957, 4 episodes) 
 Bang the Drum Slowly (1956)
Alfred Hitchcock Presents (1957–1958, 2 episodes) 
The Brothers Karamazov (1958) – Smerdjakov
Climax! (1958, 2 episodes) 
The Bravados (1958) – Ed Taylor
Adventures in Paradise (1959) – Paul LeBlanc
Have Gun - Will Travel (1960) – Father Montalvo
The Unforgiven (1960) – Charlie Rawlins
Wild River (1960) – Hank Bailey
Wagon Train (TV series)Wagon to Ft. Anderson (1961) - George CarderRawhide (1960–1963, 2 episodes) – Vince Lowman in the episode "Incident of the Captive"; John Day / Rivers in the episode "Incident of the Pale Rider"The Twilight Zone (1960–1963, 3 episodes)Naked City (1961)The Untouchables (1961) – Steve 'Country Boy' Parrish in the episode "Power Play"The Investigators (1961) – episode "The Panic Wagon"Combat! (1962) – Sgt. JenkinsStoney Burke (1962)The Eleventh Hour (1962)Route 66 (1962-1963)The Virginian (1962–1968, 4 episodes)Redigo (1963)The Alfred Hitchcock Hour (1963) – Theodore Bond The Travels of Jaimie McPheeters (1963)The Fugitive (1964)The Outrage (1964) – Sheriff
’’Daniel Boone (1964-65, 20 episodes)’’ — Yadkin Battle of the Bulge (1965)  – Uncredited (Fuel Truck soldier)The Legend of Jesse James (1966)Twelve O'clock High (1966)Voyage to the Bottom of the Sea (TV series) (1966, Season 2, Episode 21, Dead Man's Doubloons) – Captain Albert BrentThe Big Valley (1966–1967, 2 episodes)Lost in Space (1966–1968, 2 episodes) – Alonzo P. TuckerCuster (1967)The Flim-Flam Man (1967) – Deputy MeshawHour of the Gun (1967) – Octavius RoyGunsmoke (1967) – Ed Corsairs (S12E26)The Ambushers (1967) – Jose OrtegaThe Road West (1967)That Girl (1968, Season 2, Episode 24) – GeorgeBonanza (1968) Episode "The Thirteenth Man" – Marcus AlleyThree Guns for Texas (1968) – Cletus GroganFour Rode Out (1970) – (uncredited)Gunsmoke "Sergeant Holly" (1970) S16 Ep14 – Willis JeeterLand of the Giants (1970) – Melzac / BrykMcCloud (1970, Season 1, Episode 3) – Goose JenkinsHawaii Five-O TV Series (1970) Episode- The Payoff The High Chaparral (1971) (1 episode, Season 4) – White HorseLawman (1971) – Harvey StenbaughThe Deserter (1971) – SchmidtEscape from the Planet of the Apes (1971) – E-1Something Big (1971) – Jonny Cobb Night Gallery (1972)Kung Fu (1972 TV series) (1972 Pilot movie) Raif / (1973 Nine Lives) Shawn Mulhare / (1974 Cry of the Night Beast) Reuben Branch The Take (1974) – DolekA Place Without Parents (1974) – CannonballThe Legend of Earl Durand (1974) – Jack McQueenThe Crazy World of Julius Vrooder (1974) – Splint79 Park Avenue (1977)Black Oak Conspiracy (1977) – Sheriff GrimesOnce an Eagle (1977)Viva Knievel! (1977) – CortlandMoonshine County Express (1977) – Sheriff LarkinEmpire of the Ants (1977) – Sheriff Art KincadeThe Sweet Creek County War (1979) – George BreakworthLove and Bullets (1979) – Andy MintonSteel (1979) – TankCuba Crossing (1980) – DelgatoCloud Dancer (1980) – Ozzie RandolphBrubaker (1980) – Rory PokeCaddyshack (1980) – Mr. NoonanDragonslayer (1981) – GreilSt. Helens (1981) – Clyde WhittakerThe Guns and the Fury (1981) – Colonel LiahkovBurned at the Stake (1982) – Capt. BillinghamI'm Dancing as Fast as I Can (1982) – Ben MartinSuperstition (1982) – Inspector SturgessLove Child (1982) – Captain EllisHart to Hart (1983) – Season 5, Episode 9 – Mac BridgerKnight Rider (1983)The A-Team (1983)Hard to Hold (1984) – Johnny LawsonBorn American (1986) – US Ambassador DraneBreaking In (1989) – Johnny Scot, Poker PlayerMission Impossible'' (1989) - Richard Kester
Gore Vidals Billy The Kid (1989), as Mr Maxwell

References

Bibliography
Grabman, Sandra (2004). "Spotlights & Shadows: The Albert Salmi Story". Published by Bear Manor Media 2004, second edition 2010. .

External links

 
 
 
 Albert Salmi mini-bio
 

1928 births
1990 deaths
1990 suicides
20th-century American male actors
American male film actors
American male stage actors
American male television actors
American murderers
American people of Finnish descent
Haaren High School alumni
Male Western (genre) film actors
Male actors from New York City
Murder–suicides in Washington (state)
People from Brooklyn
Suicides by firearm in Washington (state)
United States Army personnel of World War II
Western (genre) television actors
Wagon Train season 5 episode 34 The Frank Carter Story.